The Business Integrity Commission (BIC) is the agency of the New York City government responsible for regulating the private carting industry, public wholesale markets businesses, and the shipboard gambling industry. Its purpose is to combat corruption in these industries from organized crime, and was created from the 2001 Organized Crime Control Commission, itself created from the 1996 Trade Waste Commission, the Markets Division in the Small Business Services Department, and the Gambling Commission.

It consists of a chairperson appointed by the mayor and of the commissioners of the Police Department, the Department of Consumer and Worker Protection, the Department of Investigation, the Department of Small Business Services and the Department of Sanitation, or their designees.

Inspectors and Investigators

The inspectors and investigators of  the  New York City Business Integrity Commission are designated as peace officers by the  chairperson  of  such  commission; pursuant to section 210(82) of the NYS criminal procedure law. As Peace Officers (Inspectors and investigators) they are tasked with conducting investigations of accidents involving private carting trucks, criminal complaints and also affect arrest of violators of New York State Penal Law, and issue civil and criminal summonses. They also perform enforcement of the rules and regulations governing the private carting industry and or the city owned public wholesale markets in New York City. These inspectors and investigators also conduct other special investigations. These may include joint investigations with the NYPD against businesses.

See also
 New York City Office of Administrative Trials and Hearings (OATH), for hearings conducted on summonses for quality of life violations issued by the Commission
 New York State Gaming Commission

Commissioners & Chairs 

Michael J Mansfield - mayor Michael Bloomberg 2007-2011

References

External links
 
 Business Integrity Commission in the Rules of the City of New York
 CityAdmin, a collection of NYC administrative decisions from the Center for New York City Law

Business Integrity Commission
Organized crime in New York City
Waste management infrastructure of New York City
Food markets in the United States
Gambling in New York (state)
Economy of New York City
Government agencies established in 2002
2002 establishments in New York City
Law enforcement agencies of New York City